The Real Housewives of New York City (abbreviated RHONY) is an American reality television series that premiered on Bravo on March 4, 2008. Developed as the second installment of The Real Housewives franchise, it has aired thirteen seasons and focuses on the personal and professional lives of several women residing in New York City.

The success of the show has resulted in two spin-offs; Bethenny Ever After and Bethenny & Fredrik.

Overview and casting

Seasons 1–4
While in pre-production, the show was initially titled Manhattan Moms. It was later rebranded to become the second installment of the then-new Real Housewives franchise. The first season premiered on March 4, 2008, and starred Bethenny Frankel, Luann de Lesseps, Alex McCord, Ramona Singer, and Jill Zarin.

Kelly Killoren Bensimon was added to the cast for the second season, which premiered on February 17, 2009. The third season premiered March 4, 2010 and saw the addition of Sonja Morgan as a main cast member, along with Jennifer Gilbert in a recurring capacity. In August 2010, Frankel left the show in order to expand her Skinnygirl product line.

Cindy Barshop replaced Frankel for the show's fourth season, which premiered on April 7, 2011. After the fourth season, McCord, Zarin, Killoren Bensimon, and Barshop were effectively let go from the show.

Seasons 5–8

In April 2012, Bravo announced a revamp to the cast for its fifth season, integrating Aviva Drescher, Carole Radziwill, and Heather Thomson into the main cast. The season premiered on June 4, 2012. Production for the sixth season was set to begin on May 8, 2013, but the cast instead chose to go into salary negotiations with Bravo, effectively delaying shooting. Drescher, Morgan, Radziwill, Singer, and Thomson renewed their contract in May 2013, while de Lesseps was demoted to a recurring role. The sixth season premiered on March 11, 2014, a year later than planned with Kristen Taekman as the latest housewife. Drescher was dismissed after the sixth season.

The seventh season premiered on April 7, 2015, featuring the return of Frankel and addition of Dorinda Medley, while de Lesseps returned in a full-time role. Taekman and Thomson exited the series after the season ended. For the eighth season, which premiered on April 6, 2016, Jules Wainstein was added to the cast, while Thomson returned in a guest appearance, Taekman did not return. Wainstein left the show in September 2016 for personal reasons.

Seasons 9–13
The ninth season premiered on April 5, 2017. Tinsley Mortimer joined the cast, while former housewives Thomson and Zarin appeared as guests. The tenth season premiered on April 4, 2018, with the cast of the ninth season returning. Drescher, Killoren Bensimon, Thomson and Zarin all appeared as guests. It served as Radziwill's final appearance on the show.

The eleventh season premiered on March 6, 2019. Barbara Kavovit joined as a friend of the housewives, and Zarin appeared as a guest. Frankel departed the series after the season for a second time. The twelfth season featured Leah McSweeney joining the cast, which premiered on April 2, 2020. Zarin and Thomson appeared as guests in the twelfth season. Mortimer and Medley announced their departure from the series in June 2020 and August 2020 respectively. Mortimer coincided her announcement with her relocation to Chicago, to pursue her romantic relationship with Scott Kluth, while Medley later stated she was fired from the show.

The thirteenth season premiered on May 4, 2021, with Eboni K. Williams joining the series, in addition to Heather Thomson and Bershan Shaw appearing as friends of the housewives. In September 2021, it was confirmed by Bravo that the thirteenth season reunion was officially cancelled.

Season 14–present

On March 23, 2022, it was announced that following the thirteenth season's negative reception, the showrunners had made the decision to 'most likely' recast the show from scratch for the fourteenth season, and create a second version of the show following some of the show's original housewives, referred to as RHONY: Legacy or RHONY: Throwback. Beyond the two series, veteran housewives Luann de Lesseps and Sonja Morgan will star in a spin-off series, Luann and Sonja: Welcome to Crappie Lake, modelled after The Simple Life, which is set to premiere in 2023. Filming began mid-July 2022 in rural Southern Illinois.  

On October 16, 2022, Andy Cohen revealed the new cast for the show's fourteenth season at Bravocon, announcing that Sai De Silva, Ubah Hassan, Erin Dana Lichy, Jenna Lyons, Lizzy Savetsky, Jessel Taank and Brynn Whitfield would be leading the rebooted series. On November 16, 2022, Savetsky confirmed to Page Six that she was departing the series midway into filming the season after being met with anti-semitism hate across her social media accounts. 5 days later, Page Six reported that Savetsky was instead mutually released from the rebooted series due to behind-the-scenes controversy involving co-star Whitfield. The show is set to air sometime during 2023.

Cast

Original cast (2008–2021)

The cast of the first season consisted of Bethenny Frankel, Luann de Lesseps, Alex McCord, Ramona Singer, and Jill Zarin. As per Real Housewives tradition, the series often saw cast changes, which occurred typically every season. Other notable cast members include Kelly Killoren Bensimon, Sonja Morgan, Carole Radziwill, Heather Thomson, Dorinda Medley and Tinsley Mortimer, all of whom served in a regular capacity for at least three seasons or more.

In 2022, the Jewish Journal named Frankel and Zarin as two of "The Top 10 Jewish Reality TV Stars of All Time."

Reboot cast (2023)
In September 2021, it was confirmed by Bravo that the thirteenth season reunion was officially cancelled. In March 2022, it was announced that following the thirteenth season's negative reception, the series would see its primary cast retooled, with members of its original cast relegated to a separate show. Although the series has partially shifted its cast before, this marked the first time that the network had decided to completely replace the cast. As a result, the series fourteenth season is being billed as a series reboot, with little to no connections to the original cast of the series.

In October 2022, the new cast was announced with Sai De Silva, Ubah Hassan, Erin Dana Lichy, Jenna Lyons, Lizzy Savetsky, Jessel Taank and Brynn Whitfield leading the rebooted series. In November 2022, Savetsky and Cohen confirmed to Page Six that she was departing the series midway into filming the season. It is unclear if Savetsky will still appear in the series.

Episodes

Critical reception
The Real Housewives of New York City has received criticism for the lack of diversity in its cast. Then-current cast member Frankel stated in 2017 that she would like to see the series "represent New York more." Writing for The New York Times in October 2019, author Tracie Egan Morrissey posed the question, "If less than half of the city is white, why is 100 percent of the cast of The Real Housewives of New York City white?" Former cast member Heather Thomson also stated that during her time on the series she had pitched several women of color to the show's producers to diversify its cast members due to her concerns about the issue. The women also received backlash for highlighting the class divide in America through the ignorance and mistreatment of staff featured on the show.

Broadcast history
The Real Housewives of New York City airs regularly on Bravo in the United States; most episodes are approximately forty-two minutes in length, and are broadcast in standard definition and high definition. Since its premiere, the series has alternated airing on Monday, Tuesday, Wednesday and Thursday evenings and has been frequently shifted between the 8:00, 9:00, and 10:00 PM timeslots.

Other media
In July 2012, Bravo released a social networking video game version of The Real Housewives of New York City titled as Real Housewives: The Game. Following weekly new episodes, a new game was available based on the story.

In 2016, On Location Tours hosted an official The Real Housewives of New York-themed tour in New York City. The tour is centered around giving passengers an almost four-hour trip to visit numerous places where current and former housewives "have dined, shopped, dated or had a fight or two," and is described as the "ultimate, one-of-a-kind Real Housewives experience."

References

External links
 
 

 
2000s American reality television series
2010s American reality television series
2020s American reality television series
2008 American television series debuts
Bravo (American TV network) original programming
English-language television shows
Television shows filmed in New York City
Television shows set in New York City